Dilli Haat is a paid-entrance open-air market, food plaza, and craft bazaar located in Delhi. The area is run by Delhi Tourism and Transportation Development Corporation (DTTDC), and  unlike the traditional weekly market, the village Haat, Dilli Haat is permanent. It is located in the commercial centres of South Delhi, opposite INA market. The 6 acres of land on which this complex is situated was salvaged as part of a reclamation project and transformed into a plaza. Extensive foundation work, small thatched roof cottages and kiosks give the plaza a village atmosphere. The culture and the environment of dilli Haat is very good. People from outside come and visit Dilli Haat. It is a good place to visit with family and friends. Some shops are permanent but other sellers are rotated, usually for fifteen days.  Products offered may include rosewood and sandalwood carvings, embellished camel hide footwear, sophisticated fabric and drapery, gems, beads, brassware, metal crafts, and silk & wool fabrics. A number of shows promoting handicrafts and handlooms are held at the exhibition hall in the complex. To sell wares, there is an application process; spaces are allocated according to which state the seller is from. In all, Dilli Haat, INA Market has 62 stalls allotted on a rotational basis to craftsmen for a payment of INR 100 per day for a maximum period of 15 days.

History
Dilli Haat was established jointly by Delhi Tourism (DTDC), Government of Delhi and NDMC, D.C. (Handicrafts) and D.C. (Handlooms), Ministry of Textiles and Ministry of Tourism, Govt. of India and opened in March 1994. Around 2003, this market became fully wheelchair-accessible, including an accessible bathroom. Delhi's second Dilli Haat, the Dilli Haat, Pitampura, also was developed by DTTDC in Pitampura, close to Pitampura TV Tower and spread over 7.2 hectares, was opened in April 2008. More Dilli Haats are set to be created in other parts of Delhi with the third having been opened in Janakpuri in August 2013.

Over the years, Dilli Haat became a venue of crafts, music, dance and cultural festivals, for example India's first comic convention, Comic Con India was organized at Dilli Haat, INA, in February 2011.

Accessibility
Dilli Haat, INA Market is accessed through Dilli Haat - INA underground station of Delhi Metro, which opened in 2010; while Dilli Haat, Pitampura is serviced by Netaji Subhash Place Metro Station.

Entrance 
Dilli Haat INA is open 10:30 to 22:00, seven days a week. The entrance fee for Indian nationals is Rs. 30 for adults, Rs.20 for children under 12 years of age. Foreigners are charged Rs. 100.

Craftsmen
Only craftsmen registered with D.C. Handicrafts are eligible for places at the Dilli Haat. The stalls are allotted on a rotational basis to craftsmen who come from all corners of India at nominal payment for a period of 15 days.

See also

References

External links

Bazaars
Bazaars in India
Culture of Delhi
Indian cuisine
Indian handicrafts
Shopping districts and streets in India
South Delhi district
Tourist attractions in Delhi